The Dubai International Baja (formerly known as the Dubai International Rally) is an international baja-style rally racing event based in Dubai held around the facilities of the Dubai Innovation Centre.

History

The rally, a gravel and sand event, dates back to 1984 and it used to be the final event of the Middle East Rally Championship each year. The rally changed its name to the Emirates Rally in 1989 but changed back the following year.

In 2016 the rally was reformatted into a cross-country rally and hosted a candidate event for the FIM and FIA cross-country world cup events. In 2017, the rally became an official event, hosting competition in both the car and bike categories.

The rally has been dominated in the car category by Emirati driver Mohammed bin Sulayem who has claimed 15 victories including twelve consecutive wins from 1991 to 2002. Eleven wins have been taken by Qatari driver Nasser Al-Attiyah, including a run of eight straight from 2007 to 2014.

Winners

Auto

List of winners sourced in part from:

Bikes & Quads

External links
Official website

References

Rally competitions in the United Arab Emirates
Recurring sporting events established in 1984
Dubai
Rally raid races
Cross Country Rally World Cup races